The Kolkata Rail Museum, Howrah was established in 2006 to display the history and heritage of railways in the eastern part of India with special focus on Howrah railway station.

The collection includes the first broad gauge electric locomotive built in India, a WCM-5; a HPS-32 steam locomotive captured during the Indo-Pakistani War of 1971; and the  Indraprastha, claimed to be the oldest remaining Indian Railways shunting locomotive.

References

 
 

Howrah
2006 establishments in West Bengal
Children's museums in India
Museums established in 2006
Tourist attractions in Howrah
Museums in Kolkata
History of rail transport in West Bengal